"Sappy" is a song recorded by South Korean girl group Red Velvet for their second Japanese extended play (EP) of the same name. The song was released as the group's first digital single from the EP on January 6, 2019, by SM Entertainment and Avex Trax. Composed by Maria Marcus, Andreas Öberg, and Emyli with lyrics written by MEG.ME, it is an electro-pop and dance-pop song. The song tells about a boy picking between two love interests. It charted at number 13 on the Billboard World Digital Songs chart.

Background and composition 
On January 5, 2019, it was announced that Red Velvet will be releasing a digital single on January 6 at midnight JST (UTC+09:00). On the same day, SM Entertainment released a video teaser for the song on its official YouTube channel.

"Sappy" was composed by Maria Marcus, Andreas Öberg, and Emyli, while the lyrics were written by MEG.ME. Musically, the song was described as a brassy electro-pop and dance-pop track. Tamar Herman of Billboard noted the switching up of the single's momentum while "vacillating between the boisterous chants of the chorus and the melodic verses that explode with Red Velvet's powerful vocals". Takuo Matsumoto of Real Sound described the rare way for the Red Velvet to make a Japanese single with a pattern A-melody, B-melody, and chorus, emphasizing the "freshness" with elaborated chord progressions and melody lines. It is composed in the key of F minor, with a tempo of 106 beats per minute. Lyrically, the song tells a "Sappy" boy to pick between two love interests.

Promotion and reception 
The music video for "Sappy" was released on January 5, 2019. It shows variety of sets where Red Velvet interacts and spends their time playing around with foam while washing cars. Tamar Herman of Billboard described the "colorful, industrial setting and the peppy, hand-oriented" moves of the choreography, noting that it is a "bit of a throwback" to "Dumb Dumb" (2015). The song debuted at number 13 on the US Billboard World Digital Song Sales chart.

Credits and personnel 
Credits adapted from the liner notes of Sappy.

Studio

 Recorded at MonoTree Studio
 Edited at Victor Studio
 Mastered for One Up Mastering

Personnel

 Red Velvet (Irene, Seulgi, Wendy, Joy, Yeri)vocals, background vocals
 MEG.MElyrics
 Maria Marcuscomposition, track production
 Andreas Öbergcommposition
 Emylicomposition
 G-highvocal directing, Pro Tools operation, recording
 Shigeru Tanidaediting
 Jon Rezinmixing
 John Horescomastering

Charts

Release history

References 

2019 songs
2019 singles
Japanese-language songs
Red Velvet (group) songs
SM Entertainment singles
Songs written by Andreas Öberg
Avex Trax singles